The Columbia 36 is an American sailboat that was designed by William Crealock and first built in 1967.

Production
The design was built by Columbia Yachts in the United States. The original Columbia 36 design was built from 1967 to 1972, with 400 completed, while the Mark II was produced from 1970.

Design
The Columbia 36 is a recreational keelboat, built predominantly of fiberglass, with wood trim. It has a masthead sloop rig, a raked stem, a raised transom, an internally mounted spade-type rudder and a fixed fin keel.

Variants
Columbia 36
This model was introduced in 1967. The boat is fitted with a Palmer M-60 gasoline engine.
Sailcrafter 36
Kit built version of the Colombia 36, for amateur construction.
Columbia 36 Mark II
This model was introduced in 1970. The boat is fitted with a Universal Atomic 4 gasoline engine.

See also
List of sailing boat types

Similar sailboats
Bayfield 36
Beneteau 361
C&C 36-1
C&C 36R
Catalina 36
Coronado 35
CS 36
Ericson 36
Frigate 36
Hinterhoeller F3
Hunter 36
Hunter 36-2
Hunter 36 Legend
Hunter 36 Vision
Invader 36
Islander 36
Nonsuch 36
S2 11.0
Seidelmann 37
Vancouver 36 (Harris)

References

Keelboats
1960s sailboat type designs
Sailing yachts
Boats designed by W. I. B. Crealock
Sailboat types built by Columbia Yachts